The Tuskegee Airmen were a group of African American pilots who fought in World War II. 

Tuskegee Airmen may also refer to: 
Tuskegee Airmen National Historic Site
The Tuskegee Airmen, a 1995 movie
Tuskegee Airmen, defunct minor league baseball team.
 The 1,007 documented cadet graduates from the Advanced Aviation Training Cadet Program: List of Tuskegee Airmen Cadet Pilot Graduation Classes, 1942-1946, listing graduating Cadet Pilots by Class, Year and Class Type

See also

 List of Tuskegee Airmen Cadet Pilot Graduation Classes, 1942-1946, listing graduating Cadet Pilots by Class, Year and Class Type